Bùi Yến Ly (born 1995) is a Vietnamese Muay Thai player. She competed at the 2017 World Games for Vietnam and won the gold medal in women's 51 kg final. It was Vietnam's first gold at the 2017 World Games. She won the World Muaythai Championships' women's 51 kg category. She was born in Bac Giang Province.

References

External links

1995 births
Living people
People from Bắc Giang Province
Vietnamese Muay Thai practitioners
World Games gold medalists